Kevin Hart: I'm a Grown Little Man is a stand-up comedy special released on February 3, 2009, filmed from the Skirball Center for the Performing Arts, which was directed by Shannon Hartman, produced by Michelle Caputo and written by Kevin Hart.

References

External links
 

Stand-up comedy concert films
African-American films
2009 comedy films
2009 films
2000s English-language films